Valentin Silaghi (born April 19, 1957) is a retired boxer from Romania, who represented his native country at the 1980 Summer Olympics where he won a bronze medal. He also won three national senior titles and a silver and a bronze medal at the European Amateur Boxing Championships.

Currently he lives in Germany and coaches Luan Krasniqi.

Amateur career
Silaghi won the bronze medal at the 1980 Moscow Olympic games. His results were:
1st round bye
Defeated Alfred Thomas (Guyana) 5-0
Defeated Mark Kaylor (Great Britain) 3-2
Lost to José Gómez Mustelier (Cuba) 0-5

References
 databaseOlympics.com

External links

1957 births
Living people
Light-middleweight boxers
Boxers at the 1980 Summer Olympics
Olympic boxers of Romania
Olympic bronze medalists for Romania
Olympic medalists in boxing
Romanian male boxers
Medalists at the 1980 Summer Olympics